is a passenger railway station located on the border between the cities of  Amagasaki and Nishinomiya, Hyōgo Prefecture, Japan. Thus, the respective east and west entrances to the station are in different cities.  It is operated by the private transportation company Hanshin Electric Railway.

Lines
It is also the terminus of the 1.7 kilometer Hanshin Mukogawa Line.

Layout
The station consists of two opposed elevated side platforms serving two tracks on a bridge over Mukogawa River for the Hanshin Main Line. The unnumbered dead-headed Mukogawa Line island platform is on the Nishinomiya (west) side of the bridge, perpendicular to the Main Line. One side of the platform is not in use.

Platforms
Main Line

Mukogawa Line

History
Mukogawa Station opened on April 12, 1905 along with the rest of the Hanshin Main Line.

On 1 April 2014, station numbering with Naruo being designated as station number HS-12.

Gallery

Passenger statistics
In fiscal 2020, the station was used by an average of 29,867 passengers daily

Surrounding area
Hyogo College of Medicine
 Hyogo College of Medicine Hospital

See also
List of railway stations in Japan

References

External links

 Mukogawa Station website 

Railway stations in Japan opened in 1905
Railway stations in Hyōgo Prefecture
Hanshin Main Line
Amagasaki
Nishinomiya